Robinson's joint consistency theorem is an important theorem of mathematical logic. It is related to Craig interpolation and Beth definability.

The classical formulation of Robinson's joint consistency theorem is as follows:

Let  and  be first-order theories. A theory  is called complete if it decides every formula, meaning that for every sentence  the theory contains the sentence or its negation but not both (that is, either  or ).

Since the completeness assumption is quite hard to fulfill, there is a variant of the theorem:

Let  and  be first-order theories.

See also

References

 
 Robinson, Abraham, 'A result on consistency and its application to the theory of definition', Proc. Royal Academy of Sciences, Amsterdam, series A, vol 59, pp 47-58.

Mathematical logic
Theorems in the foundations of mathematics